Onbaşılar is a village in the Yüksekova District of Hakkâri Province in Turkey. The village is populated by Kurds of the Dirî tribe and had a population of 1,047 in 2022.

The hamlets of Ağaçlı, Ağılcık, Armutlu, Çamdalı, Çobanpınarı, Dereiçi and Sarıkaya are attached to it.

Population 
Population history from 2000 to 2022:

References 

Kurdish settlements in Hakkâri Province
Villages in Yüksekova District